The 2002 CONCACAF Gold Cup was the sixth edition of the Gold Cup, the soccer championship of North America, Central America and the Caribbean (CONCACAF).

The tournament was once again held in the United States, in Miami and Pasadena. The format of the tournament stayed the same as in 2000: twelve teams were split into four groups of three. The top two teams in each group would advance to the quarterfinals. Ecuador and South Korea were invited from outside CONCACAF.

Canada, who rode the coin toss all the way to winning the 2000 Cup, needed luck once again, as all games in Group D ended with a 2-0 result. Lots were drawn, with Canada and Haiti moving on to the next round; Ecuador did not. But the Canadian team's luck ran dry in the semifinals, as the U.S. beat them on penalties after tying 0-0. The United States then met Costa Rica in the final and topped them 2-0 behind goals by Josh Wolff and Jeff Agoos for their first tournament win since 1991.

During the tournament, Cuban players Alberto Delgado and Rey Angel Martinez defected from Cuba to the United States.

Qualified teams

Qualification play-off
A qualification playoff to determine the final Gold Cup entrant was held in July and August 2001.

Cuba won 1–0 on aggregate.

Venues

Squads

The 12 national teams involved in the tournament were required to register a squad of 18 players; only players in these squads were eligible to take part in the tournament.

Group stage

Group A

Group B

Group C

Group D

Knockout stage

Quarterfinals

Semifinals

Third place match

Final

Awards

The following awards were given at the conclusion of the tournament.
Most Valuable Player:  Brian McBride
Top Goalkeeper:  Lars Hirschfeld
Fair Play Trophy:  Costa Rica

Best XI

Statistics

Goalscorers
4 goals
 Brian McBride

3 goals
 Kevin McKenna

2 goals

 Rolando Fonseca
 Rónald Gómez
 Paulo Wanchope
 Álex Aguinaga

1 goal

 Dwayne De Rosario
 Walter Centeno
 Hernán Medford
 Santos Dagoberto Cabrera
 Juan Carlos Plata
 Charles Alerte
 Golman Pierre
 Patrick Percin
 Adolfo Bautista
 Marco Garcés
 Jair García
 Carlos Ochoa
 Choi Jin-cheul
 Kim Do-hoon
 Song Chong-gug
 Stern John
 Jeff Agoos
 DaMarcus Beasley
 Landon Donovan
 Ante Razov
 Josh Wolff

Own goals

 Mark Rogers (for Martinique)
 Kim Do-hoon (for Canada)
 Édison Méndez (for Haiti)

References

External links
Official Recap

 
2002 in CONCACAF football
2002
2002
2002 in American soccer
2002 in South Korean football
2002 in Ecuadorian football